Gaelen Gilliland (born in Milwaukee, Wisconsin) is an American musical theatre actress. She has appeared on Broadway in Wicked, Legally Blonde, 9 to 5: The Musical (original Broadway cast), Honeymoon in Vegas (original Broadway cast), and Kinky Boots. Her  most recent Broadway production was as Mayor of Bikini Bottom in Spongebob The Musical. She worked on the pre-production and out of town performance of Finding Neverland. She also has appeared in 
the 1st National tour of Seussical: The Musical as Mayzie with Cathy Rigby as well as  The Addams Family 1st National tour as Alice Beineke. She starred in the American tour of Mean Girls. Gaelen has performed in many regional theater productions most recently as Diana Goodman in Next To Normal at the Homdel Theatre Company, Holmdel, NJ.

Credits

Broadway
Wicked (Broadway Cast) [Ensemble, u/s Madame Morrible] *Replacement*
Legally Blonde: The Musical (Original Broadway Cast) [Mom, Courtney, Whitney, Ensemble u/s Paulette, Vivienne, Enid)
9 to 5: The Musical (Original Broadway Cast) [Swing, u/s Doralee, Judy]
Honeymoon in Vegas (Original Broadway Cast) Ensemble
Kinky Boots (Replacement) [Swing, u/s Pat, Trish, Milan Stage Manager]
 SpongeBob SquarePants: The Broadway Musical (Original Broadway Cast) [Mayor of Bikini Bottom]

National tours
 The Addams Family (Replacement) [Alice Beineke]
 Seussical (Original Cast) [Mayzie LaBird]
 Mean Girls (Original Cast) [Mrs. Heron/Ms. Norbury/Mrs. George]

Special skills
Tap dance
Inline skating
Being proficient in French
Aerobic certified
Marathon runner
Sketch comedy and characters

External links
Official Website

American stage actresses
Living people
Year of birth missing (living people)
21st-century American women